Sads (typeset as sads and formerly as SADS) is originally a punk rock, post-punk and glam rock band formed in Japan in 1999. The band made its debut with the single "Tokyo". They released nine singles and five albums before their disbandment in 2003. In 2010, Sads reformed with a more hard rock/heavy metal sound and signed to the Avex label. They have since released two albums and one single.

History
Sads was formed by Kiyoharu, vocalist of the disbanded Kuroyume, in May 1999 and at the same time formed his own record label "Full Face". Their first live tour was held in the United Kingdom. Kiyoharu has said that the decision to tour internationally from the very beginning was to test Sads' ability to "compete worldwide".

Their first album, Sad Blood Rock'n'Roll, was a continuation of the bare-bones punk and garage rock from the last Kuroyume album, Corkscrew. Sads eventually delved more into glam rock and post-punk territory as their releases progressed.

In early 2010, Kiyoharu announced that Sads and Kuroyume would be resuming activities again, though the other original members of Sads would not be returning; instead, the band now included K-A-Z, the guitarist of the band Detrox, Keisuke Kubota, support bassist for the band 30size, and Go, leader and drummer of the band Suns Owl. They released their first album since reforming, The 7 Deadly Sins, on July 7, 2010.

Their official fanclub was originally called "Rubbersole", but was renamed "VIP" after reforming in 2010.

Members

Final lineup 
 Kiyoharu – vocals (1999-2003, 2010–2018) (Kuroyume)
 K-A-Z - guitar (2010–2018) (ex:Detrox, Raglaia)
 Go - drums (2010–2018) (Suns Owl, Zigoku Quartet)
 Yutaro - bass (2017–2018) (Undervár, ex:Jelly→, ex:Laid Back Ocean)

Former members
 Taketomo Sakashita – guitar (1999-2003) (The Dust 'n' Bonez, Bad Six Babies, The Slut Banks)
 Tetsuhiro Tanuma - bass (1999)
Masaru Kobayashi – bass (2000-2003) (Nil, The Cro-Magnons)
Keisuke Kubota - bass (2010-2017)  (ex:Hayabusa Jones, Ohio101)
Masahiro Muta - drums (1999-2001)
 Eiji Mitsuzono - drums (2001-2003) (The Dust 'n' Bonez, Ex:Wild Flag, Bow Wow, The Slut Banks)

Discography

Albums

Studio albums 
 Sad Blood Rock 'n' Roll (September 2, 1999)
 Babylon (June 7, 2000)
 The Rose God Gave Me (August 29, 2001)
 “ ”(untitled) (April 12, 2002)
 13 (March 26, 2003)
 The 7 Deadly Sins (July 7, 2010)
 Lesson 2 (December 8, 2010)
 Erosion (June 14, 2014)
Falling (October 24, 2018)

Compilations 

 Greatest Hits ~Best Of 5 Years~ (July 9, 2003)
 Sads Rare Box "Recoup" (September 28, 2005)
 The Rose God Gave Me L.A. Mix Version (Reissue: March 21, 2007)
 Rare Tracks (Reissue: March 21, 2007)

Singles
 "Tokyo" (July 7, 1999)
 "Sandy" (October 14, 1999)
 "Nudity" (赤裸々, January 13, 2000)
 "Boukyaku no Sora" (忘却の空, April 12, 2000)
 "Strawberry" (ストロベリー, April 12, 2000)
 "Nightmare" (November 16, 2000)
 "Porno Star" (June 20, 2001)
 "Appetizing 4 Songs EP" (July 25, 2001)
 "Masquerade" (May 28, 2003)
 "Disco" (November 10, 2010)
 "Spin" (June 14, 2014)
"May I Stay/Light of Life" (DVD single) (2015)
"Freely (Venue Ver.)" (September 5, 2018)

References

External links
 

Avex Group artists
Japanese heavy metal musical groups
Japanese punk rock groups
Japanese glam rock musical groups
Japanese post-punk music groups
Visual kei musical groups
Musical groups established in 1999
Musical groups disestablished in 2003
Musical groups reestablished in 2010
Musical groups from Tokyo
1999 establishments in Japan